Lodi Gardens is a city park situated in New Delhi, India. The site is now protected by the Archaeological Survey of India (ASI).

The gardens are situated between Khan Market and Safdarjung's Tomb on Lodi Road and is a popular spot for morning walks for the Delhites.

Architecture
In the middle of the gardens is the Bara Gumbad ("Big Dome"), it consists of a large rubble-construct dome and is not a tomb but was constructed as a gateway to either the attached three domed masjid (mosque) or a large walled enclosure. Both the Bara Gumbad and the mosque were built in 1494 during the reign of Sikander Lodi, there is also a residence surrounding a central courtyard, where the remains of a water tank can be seen. Opposite the Bara Gumbad is the Shisha Gumbad ("mirror dome") for the glazed tiles used in its construction, which contains graves, whose occupants are not clearly identifiable (either an unknown family of Sikandar Lodi's court or Bahlul Lodi).

To the north of the garden are the remains of a stream which may once have run as far as the Yamuna River, and by its side is the Tomb of Sikandar Lodi. This structure still has the battlements enclosing it. Visible from Sikander's tomb is the Athpula ("Eight Piered") Bridge, one of the few monuments in Delhi that were built during the reign of Mughal Emperor Akbar, it contains seven arches, amongst which the central one being the largest.
The tomb of Mohammed Shah, the last of the Sayyid dynasty rulers, the earliest of the tombs in the garden, was built in 1444 by Ala-ud-din Alam Shah as a tribute to Mohammed Shah. The tomb is octagonal in shape, with numerous ornamental Hindu-style chhatris around the central dome, numerous arches, verandahs and sloping buttresses. There are turrets at each corner. The main tomb is supported by a 16-sided drum. It is of a flattened type and is surrounded by chhatris, which make it look diminutive compared to its substantially larger base. Several years later, the Tomb of Sikandar Lodi seems to have been copied from this Sayyid tomb.

As there is little architecture dating to the Sayyid and the Lodi periods still standing, Lodi Gardens is an important archaeological site. The tomb of Mohammed Shah is visible from Lodi Road, and is the earliest structure in the gardens. It is a good example of a combination of the Hindu and Islamic styles of architecture. The Hindu features include eight chhatris, each of them capped by a lotus finial with a decorative band around the base; corner ornamental pinnacles (guldastas)and chhajja.

Gallery

See also

 The Lodhi
 Delhi Sultanate
 Sunder Nursery
 List of Monuments of National Importance in Delhi
 Bara Gumbad
 Shisha Gumbad
 Sikandar Lodi
 Tomb of Bahlul Lodi
 Ibrahim Lodhi's Tomb
 Tomb of Sikandar Lodi
 Khwaja Khizr Tomb

References

Further reading
 Sunday at the Lodi Gardens, by Vinay Dharwadker. Published by Viking, 1994.
 Lalkot to Lodi Gardens: (Delhi of Sultans), by Ranjit Sinha. Published by South Asia Books, 1996.

External links

 Lodi Gardens at wikimapia

Parks in Delhi
Lodi dynasty
Architecture in India
Architecture of the Delhi Sultanate
Monuments and memorials in Delhi
Gardens in India
Burial sites of the Lodi dynasty
Protected areas with year of establishment missing